Pontypridd F.C. is an amateur Welsh football team based in Pontypridd, formed in 2018 and inspired by the former professional club Pontypridd AFC that existed between 1911 and 1926. The club was reformed in May 2018 by former members of the Pontypridd Town reserve team.

History of Pontypridd AFC
Pontypridd AFC (known also as "The Dragons") was founded as a professional football club in 1911 to "promote first class association football in the Pontypridd District". The club were based at Taff Vale Park in the nearby community Trefforest. Pontypridd AFC played in the Southern League between 1911 and 1926. The club also played in the Welsh League and were champions in the 1923–24 season. Pontypridd AFC were Welsh Cup finalists in 1912, 1913 and 1921. The Dragons won the South Wales FA Senior Cup in 1925.

The Reformed Club

At the end of the 2017–18 season the players and coaches of Pontypridd Town reserves decided to form their own club based in the town. There were several reasons for the split, including frustrations at being unable to progress further up the Welsh football pyramid as a reserve team, lack of opportunities for the players to progress within the Pontypridd Town set-up and a desire to keep a football club representing Pontypridd in the town following Pontypridd Town's move to Cardiff (and later Aberdare).

Pontypridd FC currently play in the Taff Ely Rhymney Valley League and play their home matches at the Maritime Recreation Ground, a 3G pitch on the site of the former Pontypridd/Maritime Colliery though they are due to move to the vacant Ynysangharad Park for the 2021–22 season with Pontypridd Town due to make their home at the USW fields a permanent one.

League Record

References

Sport in Rhondda Cynon Taf
Taff Ely & Rhymney Valley Alliance League clubs
Association football clubs established in 2018
Association football clubs established in 1911
Welsh Football League clubs
Southern Football League clubs